Timor Lorosae: The Unseen Massacre is a 2001 Brazilian documentary film directed by actress and director Lucélia Santos. The film shows the situation in East Timor, a year after the ballot that decided its independence.

Awards and nominations

The film won the Audience Award at the 2002 Recife Cinema Festival.

References